This is a list of USC Trojans baseball seasons. The USC Trojans baseball program is a college baseball team that represents the University of Southern California in the Pac-12 Conference in the National Collegiate Athletic Association. The Trojans have played their home games at Dedeaux Field in Los Angeles, California since 1974.  

The Trojans have won 12 College World Series titles, more than any other program, and have reached the ultimate event 21 times.  They have appeared in the NCAA Division I baseball tournament 37 times.

Season results

Notes

References

 
Usc
USC Trojans baseball seasons